Concrete Pharaohs, directed by Jordan Todorov, is a 2010 Bulgarian documentary film exploring the lifestyle of the Kalderash Roma – a closed community of no more than 1 million people all over the world.

Synopsis
Welcome to the picturesque world of the Kalderash Roma - a closed community of no more than 1 million people all over the world. Concrete Pharaohs shows the lifestyle and traditions of the most hidden and intriguing Roma communities. A charismatic Gypsy baron will walk us through his stories and his new house. We will learn the hot trends in Roma tombstone design. We will go down into the underground homes of African granite, furnished with beds, wardrobes, stereos and a charged cell phone - a direct line to the other world. A celebration of life and afterlife in all of their manifestations.

External links
 

2010 films
2010s Bulgarian-language films
Romani-language films
Bulgarian documentary films
2010 documentary films
Documentary films about Romani people
Kalderash
Documentary films about death
2010 multilingual films
Bulgarian multilingual films